Darrin MacLeod (born March 4, 1994) is a retired Canadian professional soccer player who is currently the goalkeeping coach for Sporting Kansas City II of the USL Championship.

Career

Youth 
MacLeod played for Kitchener Minor Soccer from 2003 to 2006 before moving to Oakville Soccer Club (OSC) playing for the 1994 Raiders A for 5 years, MacLeod and the Oakville Raiders would win the Ontario Cup in 2007 and 2009.  MacLeod was awarded OSC (Oakville Soccer Club) Male Youth Athlete of the year for 2009.

MacLeod has previously trained with Newcastle United on multiple occasions as well as Sporting Lisbon, Portugal.

College 
MacLeod played four years of college soccer at Drake University between 2013 and 2016. He didn't appear as a Freshman in 2012 and redshirted his senior year in 2016. MacLeod finished as All-Time Goalkeeper Leader in program history in games (76), minutes (6940:22), saves (308), shut-outs (19) and wins (33)

While at college, MacLeod played for Premier Development League sides K-W United and TFC Academy.

Professional

Swope Park Rangers
In February 2017, MacLeod signed with Swope Park Rangers of the United Soccer League . He made his professional debut on August 6, 2017 in a 0–0 draw with Saint Louis FC, earning a penalty save. After two seasons with Swope Park, MacLeod was released at the end of the 2018 season.

North Carolina FC
In February 2019, MacLeod joined North Carolina FC, another USL club.

Coaching
After finishing his playing career, MacLeod joined Sporting Kansas City as the goalkeeping coach for the club's academy.

In February 2021, MacLeod was named goalkeeping coach for SKC's USL Championship side Sporting Kansas City II.

Career statistics

References

External links 
 Drake Bulldogs profile
 
 Soccerway profile

1994 births
Living people
Canadian soccer players
Expatriate soccer players in the United States
Drake Bulldogs men's soccer players
K-W United FC players
Toronto FC players
Sporting Kansas City II players
North Carolina FC players
Association football goalkeepers
Soccer people from Ontario
Sportspeople from Waterloo, Ontario
USL League Two players
USL Championship players
Sporting Kansas City II coaches
USL Championship coaches
Sporting Kansas City non-playing staff